The One-Eye River  is a river in the parishes of Manchester and St Elizabeth in Jamaica. It is a tributary of the Black River.

Course
The hydrology of the area is complex, with several sinks and risings. As a consequence, different sources give different interpretations.

Directorate of Overseas Surveys 1:50,000 map

The Directorate of Overseas Surveys published several editions of a 1:50,000 scale map of the island from the 1950s on. Sheet D of the first edition shows the One Eye River rising a little north of Oxford Cave and a little south of Auchtembeddie. From here it flows south to a point a little north of Oxford railway halt where it is joined by Rotten Gut River, its only tributary. It reappears on the western side of the ridge, still called One Eye River, where it continues on a generally westward course, now very sinuously through the fields of a sugar estate, eventually joining the Black River a little to the east of Windsor.

There is no mention of a Coffee River on this map.

Jamaica Underground (book)
This states on page 37 that the One Eye River is derived from the Coffee River which rises in the Coffee River Cave. This was shown by the 1965-1966 Karst Hydrology Expedition using a soluble dye to be a continuation of the Hectors River after its disappearance into Hectors River Sink 1.

Wording on page 37 also implies that the section of the One Eye River from its confluence with the Rotten Gut River to the Wallingford Sink is sometimes called the Rotten Gut River.

The remainder of the description in this book matches what is depicted on the Directorate of Overseas Surveys map.

See also
List of rivers of Jamaica

References
General
Ford, Jos C. and Finlay, A.A.C. (1908).The Handbook of Jamaica. Jamaica Government Printing Office

Inline

External links
Aerial view of the general area.
Aerial view of approximate site of One Eye River's rising.
Aerial view of approximate site of Coffee River Cave.
Aerial view of the confluence of Rotten Gut River with One Eye River.
Aerial view of Wallingford Sink.
Aerial view of the One Eye River's second rising, west Wallingford.
Aerial view of the confluence of the One Eye River with the Black River.

Rivers of Jamaica